Seer Sharqi Bhattian is one of the 51 union councils of Abbottabad District in Khyber-Pakhtunkhwa province of Pakistan. It is located in the south of the district – to the south and east it borders Murree, it also borders the following union councils within Abbottabad District, to the north Seer Gharbi, and to the west is Nagri Totial.

Subdivisions
The Union Council is subdivided into the following areas: Nareela,  Mera Rohmal, Lower Bhattian, Pandan, Tian, Leeran, Bhattian, Seer Sharqi and Taror.
Former Tehsil Nazam Mehmood Hayat Abbasi also belongs to this Uc. He  is the person who gave this Uc to people during his era. Before, it was a part of Uc Nagri total.

References

Union councils of Abbottabad District

fr:Seer Sharqi Bhattian